Dr. Michael G. Tordoff is a psychobiologist working at the Monell Chemical Senses Center. His research deals with the genetics and physiology of taste and nutrition.  His early work addressed (a) how and what animals learn about the value of their food, (b) how artificial sweeteners influence appetite and body weight, (c) how salt intake is regulated, and (d) how dietary calcium influences salt intake. Recently, he has been investigating calcium taste and appetite.  He is the primary proponent of the notion that calcium is a basic taste, equivalent to sweet, sour, salty, and bitter.

Dr. Tordoff hosts the Monell Mouse Taste Phenotyping Project.  In August 2009, he bicycled across the USA in 27 days.  He is married to, and often collaborates with, Dr. Danielle Reed.

Reference list

Recent publications

External links
Dr. Tordoff's page at the Monell Chemical Senses Center website
The Elsevier Science Direct Directory of the works of Dr. Tordoff

Living people
1956 births
American geneticists